Charles Sheldon may also refer to:
Charles Mills Sheldon (1866–1928), US-born war correspondent and illustrator, who lived in London for most of his adult life
Charles Sheldon (1857–1946), American minister, prohibitionist, and leader of the Social Gospel movement
Charles Alexander Sheldon (1867–1928), American conservationist, "Father of Denali National Park"
Charles H. Sheldon (1840–1898), second Governor of South Dakota